The Biggest Prize in Sport is the third studio album by English punk/rock band 999.  It peaked at No. 177 on the U.S. Billboard Album Chart. The album was re-released on CD in 1999 on Anagram Records. Nick Cash: "Pablo (Labritain) broke his arm in ’78, two days before we were doing a show at the SO36 Club in Berlin. Ed (Case) was part of our following, the Southall Crew. We went to the rehearsal and he knew all the songs note perfect. He was very young, about 17. He was fantastic and got a standing ovation. He was a brilliant drummer. From that, Ed then went on to play with Hazel O'Connor, and then worked at the Victoria Theatre playing the drummer in Buddy the Musical."

Reception

Charts

Track listing
Tracks of the US and Canada releases of the album are in a different order than the UK and European releases.  The 1999 CD release has the same track listing of the UK/EU edition, and three bonus tracks.

Personnel
999
 Nick Cash – lead vocals, guitar
 Guy Days – guitar, backing vocals
 Jon Watson – bass, backing vocals
 Eddie Case – drums, backing vocals
 Pablo Labritain – composer

Production
 Vic Maile – producer (original LP)
 Malcolm Garrett – artwork
 Chris Gabrin – photography

Release history

References

Sources

External links

The Biggest Prize in Sport at NineNineNine.net.

The Biggest Prize in Sport at Rate Your Music

1979 albums
Albums produced by Vic Maile
Ariola Records albums
Polydor Records albums
999 (band) albums